Chama congregata, or the corrugated jewel box clam, is a species of bivalve mollusc in the family Chamidae. It can be found along the Atlantic coast of North America, ranging from North Carolina to the West Indies and Bermuda.

References

Chamidae
Molluscs of the Atlantic Ocean
Bivalves described in 1833